Knyazhaya is a rural locality (a village) in Pyatovskoye Rural Settlement, Totemsky  District, Vologda Oblast, Russia. The population was 9 as of 2002.

Geography 
Knyazhaya is located 6 km east of Totma (the district's administrative centre) by road. Posyolok Myasokombinata is the nearest rural locality.

References 

Rural localities in Tarnogsky District